Rick T. Haselton (born 1953) is a former Judge of the Oregon Court of Appeals. He served from 1994–2015. From 2012–2015, he served as Chief Judge of the Court.

Born in Oregon, Haselton received a high school diploma from West Albany High School in 1972 and an A.B. in political science from Stanford University in 1976.  While at West Albany and Stanford, he worked as a farmworker, carpenter's helper, and teaching assistant.  He received a J.D. in 1979 from Yale Law School, where he was a classmate and friend of future U.S. Supreme Court Justice Sonia Sotomayor.

During law school, Haselton clerked for the U.S. Attorney for Oregon Sidney I. Lezak.  After leaving law school, he clerked for U.S. Ninth Circuit Court of Appeals Judge Alfred Goodwin from 1979 to 1980.  In 1980, he became an attorney in private practice with the law firm of Lindsay, Hart, Neil & Weigler.  He went on to join Haglund & Kirtley, where he worked until being appointed to the Oregon Court of Appeals in 1994.

References

1953 births
Living people
Oregon Court of Appeals judges
People from Albany, Oregon
Stanford University alumni
Yale Law School alumni
Date of birth missing (living people)